The Wackness is a 2008 American coming-of-age comedy-drama film written and directed by Jonathan Levine and starring Josh Peck, Ben Kingsley, Mary-Kate Olsen, Famke Janssen, and Olivia Thirlby. The film is distributed by Sony Pictures Classics.

Plot
In the summer of 1994 in New York City, Luke Shapiro is trading marijuana in exchange for therapy from his psychiatrist, Dr. Jeffery Squires. He graduates from high school but while dealing at a party, he finds out that Justin and most of his class have left for the summer, except for him and his classmate and Squires' stepdaughter, Stephanie "Steph" Squires. When Luke returns home, he finds his parents arguing over money and their probable eviction from their Manhattan apartment.

Luke starts dealing more marijuana to make money for his family. After a session with Squires, he bumps into Steph and invites her to come with him dealing around the city. She has a great time and gives Luke her number so she will not be lonely in the city for the summer. 

Luke calls Steph but ends up talking to Squires and they go out to a bar. While getting drunk and high, they get kicked out for underage drinking. Walking back from the bar, Luke and Squires start tagging a wall but are caught by the police. 

Steph bails them out of jail and, against Squires' wishes, takes Luke out for the day. They end up kissing. When Luke gets home, he finds he has strong feelings for her.

After Luke learns that his family is getting evicted, Steph invites him to her family's house on Fire Island while Squires and his wife go on a second honeymoon to repair their marriage. On the island, Steph finds out Luke is a virgin and gives him sex lessons. 

After taking a shower and having sex together, Luke tells Steph that he loves her. She reacts with astonishment, though Luke fails to realize that she is not interested in a committed relationship. Justin later contacts Steph asking if she wants to hang out.

Luke asks Squires for help selling pot in order to make enough money for college. He introduces Squires to his client, Eleanor, and they hit it off. As Luke's family is evicted and moves in with his grandparents in New Jersey, Luke visits Steph for companionship, only to find her on a date with Justin. 

A heartbroken Luke goes to Fire Island to seek counselling with Squires, who is on a bender because his wife left him. While high, he tries to commit suicide by drowning in the sea, but Luke stops him.

Luke later talks with Squires inside the Squires' home and Squires wishes him good luck. As he is leaving, Steph follows him to the elevator to talk to him. However, Luke asks her to not, so he can fully experience heartbreak and he leaves, leaving a regretful Steph behind. As he walks out of the complex, he puts in the mixtape Squires made for him and "All the Young Dudes" by Mott the Hoople begins playing.

In New Jersey, Luke tells his family he plans to become a psychiatrist, wanting to help other people with their problems. Back in the city, Eleanor beeps Squires and they make plans to hook up that night. The film cuts to Luke, who is smoking a joint while waiting at a train stop.

Cast
 Ben Kingsley as Dr. Jeffrey Squires
 Josh Peck as Luke Shapiro
 Famke Janssen as  Kristin Squires
 Olivia Thirlby as Stephanie "Steph" Squires
 Mary-Kate Olsen as Union
 Method Man as Percy
 David Wohl as Mr. Shapiro
 Jane Adams as Eleanor
 Talia Balsam as Mrs. Shapiro
 Aaron Yoo as Justin

Production
Jonathan Levine has said that the film is semi-autobiographical: "'I wish I could say that I sold pot and I had a shrink like Ben Kingsley, but no, it wasn't like that,' admits Jonathan Levine. 'It's the details and the backdrop, and a lot of the perspective of this kid and the way that he looks at the world,' explains Levine. 'The Stephanie character, I guess, is a composite of a few different ladies who broke up with me,' Levine says with a laugh. 'That happened.'"

Filming wrapped up on August 24, 2007. The Wackness was awarded the Audience Award for Dramatic Film at the 2008 Sundance Film Festival.

Critical reception
The film garnered positive reviews from critics. Review aggregator Rotten Tomatoes gave it a 71% approval rating based on 136 reviews, with an average rating of 6.3/10. The website's critics consensus reads, "Sympathetic characters and a clever script help The Wackness overcome a familiar plot to make for a charming coming-of-age comedy."

Josh Peck's performance in the film has been cited as helping him to establish his talents beyond his work in Nickelodeon television shows like The Amanda Show and Drake & Josh. "The film is a testament to how talented Peck really is," Noah Dominguez of CBR wrote. "While he was great (not to mention absolutely hilarious) as Josh Nichols on Drake & Josh, The Wackness highlights his range as an actor." Ben Kingsley's performance, however, earned him a Razzie Award nomination for Worst Supporting Actor (also for The Love Guru and War, Inc.).

Music
Levine wrote in The Dallas Morning News, "Beyond what worked tone-wise, a lot of the music speaks to what's going on in the movie. There's that 'Heaven & Hell' song by Raekwon when Josh is up on a water tower looking down, and it's asking, 'Is high school heaven or is it hell?' And 'Can I Kick It?' by A Tribe Called Quest plays when Kingsley's trying to kick drugs. So a lot of it just kind of worked thematically."

Levine targeted the most iconic acts of the era, with Notorious B.I.G. on the top of his list. Luke and Stephanie bond in Central Park over beer and the sounds of Total Featuring the Notorious B.I.G.'s single "Can't You See". "The What," a song from that album featuring Wu-Tang Clan member Method Man, who also appears in the film as Luke's supplier, leads off the soundtrack. Levine says he considered expanding the film's soundtrack to include Weezer and Smashing Pumpkins, two of the year's biggest non-hip-hop acts, and that the original ending featured Nirvana's Lithium."

Levine added, "Ultimately, tough choices refined the film's reach, which isn't such a bad thing. But that doesn't mean it was easy passing that other music up."

The soundtrack from the Sundance submission edit of the movie differs from the final edit, with several tracks either being shifted, replaced, or cut out of some scenes possibly due to issues of licensing.

Soundtrack
 "The What?" -- The Notorious B.I.G. feat. Method Man
 "You Used To Love Me" -- Faith Evans
 "Flava in Ya Ear" -- Craig Mack 
 "Summertime" -- DJ Jazzy Jeff & The Fresh Prince
 "Can't You See" -- Total feat. The Notorious B.I.G.
 "I Can't Wake Up" -- KRS-One
 "The World Is Yours" -- Nas
 "Can I Kick It?" -- A Tribe Called Quest
 "Heaven & Hell" -- Raekwon
 "Bump n' Grind" -- R. Kelly
 "Just a Friend" -- Biz Markie
 "Tearz" -- Wu-Tang Clan
 "Long Shot Kick De Bucket" -- The Pioneers

Home media

The Wackness was released January 6, 2009 on DVD and Blu-ray.

References

External links
 
 
 
 
 
 Interview with director Jonathan Levine and star Josh Peck at IFC.com

2000s coming-of-age comedy-drama films
American coming-of-age comedy-drama films
American films about cannabis
Films directed by Jonathan Levine
Films set in 1994
Films set in New York (state)
Films set in New York City
Sony Pictures Classics films
2008 independent films
2000s hip hop films
Hood films
New York City hip hop
Films produced by Keith Calder
2000s English-language films
2000s American films